Alice Graeme Korff (1904 – March 13, 1975) was an American art critic, trustee of the Corcoran Gallery of Art, and administrator for the Public Works of Art Project.

Her art criticism appeared in The Washington Post.
Her papers are held at the Archives of American Art.

References

External links
Oral history interview with Alice Graeme Korff, 1965 Oct. 7

1904 births
1975 deaths
The Washington Post people
American art critics
American women critics
20th-century American women writers
American women non-fiction writers
20th-century American non-fiction writers